Betrayed is a 1988 American spy thriller film directed by Costa-Gavras, written by Joe Eszterhas, and starring Debra Winger and Tom Berenger. The plot is roughly based upon the terrorist activities of American neo-Nazi and white supremacist Robert Mathews and his group The Order.

Plot
Set in the American Midwest, the film begins with the murder of a Jewish radio host in Chicago. FBI undercover agent Catherine Weaver, alias Katie Phillips, sets out to infiltrate a farming community, suspected of harboring those responsible.

After receiving a warm welcome from land-owner and farmer Gary Simmons, his two children and extended family, she begins to believe that the FBI lead is erroneous. Throwing caution to the wind, she falls in love with Simmons, a Vietnam War veteran who appears to command the respect of the local community. A short while later, her suspicions are aroused by talk of family secrets and as more chilling events unfold, Katie is exposed to the fact that Gary is the leader of a Klan-like white supremacy group involved in heinous, often gut-wrenching, acts of racial violence.

In too deep, Katie pleads with boss and mentor Michael Carnes to release her from the assignment, but he refuses, instead turning the screws on her mixed loyalties. Ultimately, she must betray either the man she loves or the country she has sworn to protect.

Cast

Production notes
The opening sequence is loosely based on the 1984 murder of Denver DJ Alan Berg, which was carried out by white supremacist group known as The Order.

Reception

Critical response
Betrayed received mostly negative reviews. At Rotten Tomatoes, the film holds a 38% "Rotten" rating based on 13 reviews.

Sheila Benson in the Los Angeles Times in August 1988 believed Betrayed contained "a loosening of the trademark Costa-Gavras tension and the sogging of a relevant issue into overwrought pulp", which for all the efforts of the actors "the film begins at the implausible and works its way quickly downhill". It lurches "from the outrageous to the outright ludicrous". 

Roger Ebert wrote: "a film that left me in turmoil, torn between the strong sympathies I felt for the characters and the fundamental doubts I had about the plot. Here were people I believed in, involved in a story that no one could believe in." Ebert thought there was a conflict between the thriller envisaged in the screenplay by Eszterhas and the presumed wish of Costa-Gavras to make a political film, but there still remains "two performances of such power that the characters become real, and sympathetic, despite everything", in reference to the central roles of Berenger and Winger. 

Janet Maslin in The New York Times itemized what she saw as the film's "story problems". She doubted there was a feasible way "to stage the sequence that has the amorous Gary dragging his new sweetheart along on a racist hunting expedition, insisting 'You'll like this' when she protests? Is it possible, after this, that she can still find him attractive? Is the F.B.I. really apt to send a brand-new female agent on such a dangerous mission, to deny her adequate backup and to bully her when she complains? John Heard, who is good as an F.B.I. colleague who's in love with Cathy, is meant to provide the element of sexual jealousy that explains this. But like too much of Betrayed, it just doesn't make sense."

In a 1996 interview, Berenger named Betrayed as his favorite film, shrugging off any media criticism with the retort "It was exactly what it was meant to be".

Box office
The film debuted at #2 at the box office, earning $5,534,787 and coming in behind the second weekend of A Nightmare on Elm Street 4: The Dream Master. The film would go on to gross $25,816,139 in the United States.

See also
 Talk Radio (film)
 American History X
 Green Room
 Imperium
 BlacKkKlansman
 White supremacist terrorism in the United States

References

External links
 
 
 

Films about the Ku Klux Klan
1988 films
1980s English-language films
1988 thriller films
American thriller films
Films about race and ethnicity
Films directed by Costa Gavras
Films set in Chicago
Films set in Texas
Films with screenplays by Joe Eszterhas
United Artists films
Works about white nationalism
Films scored by Bill Conti
American neo-noir films
1988 drama films
Films about racism in the United States
Films about the Federal Bureau of Investigation
Films about neo-Nazis
1980s American films